Jennifer Sparks is a fictional character, a superhero in the Wildstorm comic book universe created by Warren Ellis during his 1997 revamp of the dwindling Stormwatch series. Her first appearance was in issue #37 (Ellis' starting issue) where she was appointed the leader of Stormwatch Black (Black Ops division), with Swift and Jack Hawksmoor, with whom she would later create The Authority.

Sparks is described as "The Spirit of the 20th Century", having been born at its beginning and later dying at its end.  Throughout her time, she is shown to have influenced many of the most significant individuals who shaped that century, both positively and negatively.

In terms of personality, Sparks is depicted as a superficial hedonist hiding a strong underlying sense of morality.

She was named the 44th Greatest Comic Book Character by Empire Magazine in 2006.

Publication history 

Jenny Sparks first appeared in Stormwatch vol. 2 #37 (cover-dated July 1996) and was created by writer Warren Ellis and artist Tom Raney. After that series ended with the death of most characters not created by Ellis, he started a new series The Authority featuring the eponymous team led by Sparks.

After the 12th issue, Warren Ellis left the title and Mark Millar took over. He did some extra fleshing-out of Jenny's history in the Jenny Sparks: The Secret History of the Authority limited series, focused on the origin stories of the members of the Authority. Most of Millar's additions are furthering Ellis's backstory and intermeshing Jenny Sparks with important historical figures of the 20th century, including Albert Einstein, Ernest Hemingway, Adolf Hitler, Jacques Cousteau, John Lennon, Princess Diana, and many others.

Fictional character biography 
Jennifer Sparks was born in England on January 1, 1900. Her family possessed quite a fortune, and she was sent to an all-girls school in Vienna. Her family had died on the Titanic in 1912, and her father's nemesis took over their fortune. Left penniless, young Jenny was invited by her godfather, Albert Einstein, to Zurich, where he offered to finish her education. Before leaving she recommended that a young painter, whose art was quite abysmal, leave it behind and take a career in politics as he had a certain charisma and talent for speeches.

Between 1913 and 1919 her powers started to manifest. Jenny Sparks had absolute control of electricity, including travel through power lines, shooting bolts of lightning and shaping electricity. With age her control and power increased. By 1919 Jenny stopped aging.

In various comics, a number of Sparks' adventures through the early and middle part of the 20th century have been told.  A common theme in these stories is her interaction with prominent historical figures.

In the 1960s through 1980s Sparks is shown to have become involved with the first British bands of superheroes, but she encounters problems with some extreme personalities that disillusioned her to that role.

Stormwatch and The Authority 

Despite those experiences, in the 1990s she agrees to join a new group called Stormwatch that has been formed by a man named Henry Bendix

Against her wishes she is given command of a covert team called Stormwatch Black.

When Stormwatch disbanded after the Xenomorph attack that took the lives of half the team, she created a new superhero group called The Authority alongside a number of Stormwatch Black teammates. During her leadership, Jenny and her team faced many threats, including super-powered terrorists and an invasion by an alternate reality.

On 31 December 1999, Jenny Sparks knew that she would die at midnight as the 20th century ended (this date is erroneous due to the common mistake that the 21st century began on January 1, 2000 and not its actual date, January 1, 2001), a fact known only by her teammate The Doctor. She electrocuted the brain of an enormous alien creature, the "God" that had originally created Earth and which was planning to wipe the planet clean of all life. This was her final act, in her words, as humanity's defense mechanism. She died moments later in her teammates' arms. Her dying words and last will were: "Save the world. They deserve it. Be better. Or I'll come back and kick your heads in."

The passing of the spirit of the 20th century heralded the arrival of a successor. At the moment Jenny Sparks died, a new entity was born: Jenny Quantum, spirit of the 21st century.
 
During the Transfer of Power storyline, a magical version of Jenny appeared and temporarily removed all mechanical weapons from the Earth.

The New 52
In the DC Comics rebooted Stormwatch series, part of their New 52 event, Jenny's shirt was seen in storage in Stormwatch's base. Jenny Sparks herself also makes an appearance in a flashback montage, projected by Adam One, in Stormwatch's "0" edition.

The Wild Storm

In Warren Ellis' reboot of the Wildstorm properties, Jenny Sparks is reinterpreted as an aspect of a "Planetary defense system" created by aliens, complete with new powers. She is also of Asian descent, with her name being Jenny Mei Sparks, in this continuity and almost 120 years old.

Powers and abilities 
Jenny Sparks is one of the Century Babies, a being produced by the multiverse for a specific task. In her case, this was to influence the 20th century. As such, her moods are tied directly to the world's status. For example, she was suicidally depressed during the Great Depression and deliriously high during the Roaring Twenties. Additionally, she stopped aging at nineteen and remained this way until her death. Her appearance alters from time to time and it is unclear if this is an effect of her connection to the planet or artist interpretation.

Jenny has the ability to manipulate electricity. She can easily draw electricity from electronic devices as well as from the human brain, a move she has threatened to kill people with. Sparks can also convert her entire body into electricity and travel anywhere electricity would. She can apparently survive being transformed into other forms of energy as when she travelled through a TV and power lines and then into a police radio. Shifting into her electrical form heals Sparks from injuries as well as poisons. Like an electric current, Sparks as electricity must go somewhere before she can re-emerge in her human form. Normally this is into a machine, but other conductors seem to work as well. She was once able to go into the sky and remain there until striking down as lightning. She can also enter a person briefly and electrocute them.

A key distinction is that Jenny Sparks does not generate electricity like Electro and others. If she is unable to access electricity from any sources or has no place for her electrical form to go, she is powerless and as vulnerable as a normal human. This limitation is a part of many of her adventures.

Through her lifetime Sparks was a member of several branches of the British military and led various superhero teams. As such she is an experienced leader and knowledgeable about military protocol. She has not demonstrated the fighting skill that one might associate with this experience, usually relying on her powers instead.

The rebooted version of Jenny Sparks from The Wild Storm possesses the ability to travel between electronic devices, such as televisions, computers and smartphones.

Collected editions
Her appearances have been collected in trade paperbacks, including:

 Jenny Sparks: The Secret History of the Authority

References

External links 
Jenny Sparks at the International Catalogue of Superheroes

Characters created by Warren Ellis
Comics characters introduced in 1996
DC Comics female superheroes
DC Comics LGBT superheroes 
DC Comics characters who are shapeshifters
Stormwatch and the Authority characters
Wildstorm Universe superheroes
Fictional characters with electric or magnetic abilities
Fictional characters with slowed ageing